CSM may refer to:

Arts and entertainment
 Cantigas de Santa Maria, a collection of medieval Galician-Portuguese vernacular songs and poems in praise of the Virgin Mary
 Chaos Space Marines, in the Warhammer 40,000 fictional universe
 Council of Stellar Management, an Eve Online player-elected council to represent the views of the players to the game maker
 Cigarette Smoking Man, a character in The X-Files television series
 C.S. Murugabhoopathy (1914–1998), Indian mridangam player
 Chainsaw Man, a manga written and illustrated by Tatsuki Fujimoto

Education
 Calcutta School of Music, a music school in Calcutta, India
 Camborne School of Mines, an institution of higher education in Cornwall, UK
 Central Saint Martins, an art and design institution in London, UK
 Cork School of Music, a music school in Cork, Ireland
 Colegio Suizo de México, a Swiss international school in Mexico
 Certified Strategic Manager, a professional certification

United States
 College of San Mateo, a community college in San Mateo, California
 College of Southern Maryland, a community college with campuses in Charles, St. Mary's and Calvert Counties, Maryland
 Colorado School of Mines, a university in Golden, Colorado, specializing in engineering and applied sciences with a focus on natural resources
 College of Saint Mary, a Catholic women's college in Omaha, Nebraska

Finance
 CARICOM Single Market, the first phase of CARICOM Single Market and Economy, a single market union between Caribbean states
 Clearing and settlement mechanism, for example see Ethereum

Science and technology
 Apollo command and service module, a component of the Apollo spacecraft
 Scientific Centre of Monaco, research centre in Monaco

 Cerebrospinal meningitis, an acute infectious form of meningitis caused by the bacterium Neisseria meningitidis
 Chopped strand mat, a form of glass-reinforced plastic
 Circumstellar material, which surrounds some stellar objects and may contribute to the increased luminosity of certain hypernovae events
 Climate System Model, the atmospheric component of the Community Climate System Model (CCSM)
 Continuous shuffling machine, a machine used by casinos to shuffle cards
 Cortical stimulation mapping, a procedure that aims to localize the function of specific brain regions through direct electrical stimulation
 Crop simulation model, a model used to simulate crop yield based on weather conditions, soil conditions, and crop management practices
 Hypalon, marketing name for a synthetic rubber made of chlorosulfonated polyethylene

Computing
 Cascaded shadow maps, a form of shadow mapping in computer graphics design
 Certified Scrum Master, a certification for Scrum administered by Scrum Alliance.
 Certified software manager, a certification by the Software and Information Industry Association
 Cloud Service Mesh, part of Google's Anthos platform
 Cluster Systems Management, management for IBM Power Systems servers running AIX or Linux operating system, as well as Linux on x64 rack and blade servers
 Communications Support Module, an IBM term for the support of single sign-on in its Informix database
 Compatibility Support Module, a part of some UEFI firmware implementations providing legacy BIOS compatibility
 Computational science modeling, constructing models and quantitative analysis techniques and using computers; See Computational science
 Computational solid mechanics, computer modeling of solid matter, typically with finite elements; See Solid mechanics
 Content storage management, an audio, video and rich media archiving technology originally conceived by Front Porch Digital
 Content Switching Module, an add-on to the Cisco Catalyst 6500 Series Switch or the Cisco 7600 Series Router

Military
 Company sergeant major, a warrant officer appointment in the British and most Commonwealth armies and the Royal Marines
 Command Sergeant Major, a rank in the United States Army
 Conspicuous Service Medal, an Australian military decoration

Organizations
 Canadian Society of Medievalists
 The Christian Science Monitor, an international weekly newspaper published by the Church of Christ, Scientist
 Center for Superfunctional Materials, with the director Kwang Soo Kim
 Christian Socialist Movement, former name of a British socialist organisation
 Committee on Safety of Medicines, a defunct British government advisory committee
 Consiglio Superiore della Magistratura (High Council of the Judiciary), an Italian juridical institution
 Common Sense Media, a San Francisco-based non-profit education and advocacy organization
 Companion of the Sacred Mission, an Anglican religious order; See Society of the Sacred Mission
 Caritas Sisters of Jesus, said Caritas Sisters of Miyazaki, a religious institute
 Union of the Committees of Soldiers' Mothers of Russia, a Russian human rights organisation
 Creation Science Movement, a British creationist organisation

Businesses
 Chartered Semiconductor Manufacturing, a semiconductor foundry in Singapore
 Chateau Ste. Michelle, an American winery
 Cravath, Swaine & Moore, an international law firm
 CSM N.V., a Dutch maker of baking supplies

Sport
 Canadian Ski Marathon, a ski tour
 Centro Sportivo Maruinense, a Brazilian football (soccer) club

Other uses
 Castleton Moor railway station, North Yorkshire, England (National Rail station code)
 Customer success manager, in customer success
 Clinton-Sherman airport (IATA code), civil airport in Clinton, US
 Central Sierra Miwok (ISO 639-3 code), a Miwok language spoken in California, US